Ninne Ishtapaddanu is a 2003 Telugu-language film directed by Konda and produced by KL Narayana under Sri Durga Arts. The film stars Tarun, Sridevi and Anita Hassanandani
in the lead roles.

Plot 
Charan (Tarun) is a fun loving college-going guy in Vizag. He meets Sanjana (Anitha) in an interesting style. They start off their relationship with quarreling and slowly they fall in love with each other. Sanjana leaves to Hyderabad after the graduation is over. Charan also leaves to Hyderabad in search of Sanjana, as he did not get any phone calls or mails from Sanjana. On his way to Hyderabad, he meets an NRI called Boney (Rajiv Kanakala), who comes to India in search of a bride. After reaching Hyderabad, Charan accidentally meets another girl called Geeta (Sridevi), who works in All India Radio and some how settles in her house as guest. One day, he spots Sanjana who ridicules his love and says that she pretended love to him only to take revenge on him for the pranks he played on her during college time. Then she hands him over her wedding card. And the bridegroom turns out to be Boney. The rest of the film revolves around these 4 characters - Charan, Boney, Sanjana and Geetanjali. The climax is all about who gets whom.

Cast

 Tarun as Charan / Cherry
 Sridevi as Geetanjali / Geeta
 Anita Hassanandani as Sanjana / Sanju
 Rajiv Kanakala as Boney
 Sarath Babu as Sanjana's father
 Raavi Kondala Rao as Sanjana's grandfather
 Brahmanandam as Train Passenger
 Ali as Charan's friend
 Giri Babu as Charan's father
 Sunil as Bangaru Babu (Gold Babu), Sanjana's relative
 Sudha as Sanjana's mother
 Sudeepa Pinky as Charan's sister
 MS Narayana as Cop
 Mallikarjuna Rao as Peon in Charan's college
 Tanikella Bharani as All India Radio Managing Director
 Madhunandan as Charan's friend
 Sivaji Raja as Sanjana's relative
 Chinna as Boney's relative
 Hema as Bangaru Babu's wife
 Junior Relangi as Purohith
 Babloo as Charan's friend
 Athli Lakshmi as Sanjana's grandmother
 Delhi Rajeswari as Charan's mother
 Jhansi as Visalakshi / Visu Aunty / Chinna's wife
 Anitha Chowdary as Sivaji's wife
 Misro
 Ganesh
 Devi Sri
 Sakhi
 Neha Dhupia in a special appearance
 Venu Madhav in a cameo
 Raghava Lawrence in the song "Krishna Zilla"

Music

The music of the film was composed by R. P. Patnaik.

References

External links
 

2003 films
Indian romantic comedy films
Films scored by R. P. Patnaik
2000s Telugu-language films
2003 romantic comedy films